Sir Thomas Munro, 1st Baronet  (1761–1827) was a Scottish soldier and colonial administrator.

Thomas Munro may also refer to:
 Thomas Munro (solicitor) (1866–1923), Scottish solicitor, county council clerk and public servant
 Thomas Munro (art historian) (1897–1974), American philosopher of art and professor of art history
 Thomas Arthur Munro (1905–1966), Scottish physician and psychologist

See also
 Thomas Monroe (disambiguation)